Nirimba is a new locality in the Sunshine Coast Region, Queensland, Australia. It was created in 2019.

Geography
Nirimba is identified as an area in transition. Historically a rural area, it is now being developed as a suburb.

History 
Nirimba is situated in the Gubbi Gubbi (Kabi) traditional Aboriginal country.  The name Nirimba means middle in the Kabi language.

On 14 June 2019 parts of the localities of Bells Creek and Meridan Plains were excised to create the localities of Banya, Corbould Park, Gagalba and Nirimba to accommodate future suburban growth in the Caloundra South Priority Development Area.

Nirimba State Primary School opened in January 2022 with 160 foundation students.

Education 
Nirimba State Primary School is a government primary (Prep-6) school for boys and girls at 100 Park Avenue. The school opened  with 160 foundation students and its maximum capacity is 1200 students.

The nearest secondary schools are Baringa State Secondary College in neighbouring Baringa to the north-east, Meridan State College in Meridan Plains to the north and Beewah State High School in Beerwah to the south-west.

References 

Suburbs of the Sunshine Coast Region
Localities in Queensland